İsmail Güzel (born April 14, 1986)  is a Turkish wrestler.

Career 
He won 2006 European Wrestling Championships competing in the 120 kg division of Greco-Roman wrestling. He is a member of the Konya Seker Spor.

References

External links
 

 
Living people
Turkish male sport wrestlers
European Wrestling Championships medalists
1986 births
World Wrestling Championships medalists
European champions for Turkey
21st-century Turkish people